The Texas Medal of Valor, officially the Lone Star Medal of Valor, is the second highest military decoration that can be conferred to a service member of the Texas Military Forces. It can also be conferred to service members of the United States Armed Forces or other state militaries. Subsequent decorations are conferred by a silver twig of four oak leaves with three acorns on the stem device.  A lapel button is also conferred with this decoration.

Eligibility

The Lone Star Medal of Valor is conferred to any member of the Texas Military Forces who distinguishes themselves by specific acts of bravery or outstanding courage, or a closely related series of heroic acts involving personal hazard or danger and the voluntary risk of life and which resulted in an accomplishment so exceptional and outstanding as to clearly set the individual apart from his/her comrades or from other persons in similar circumstances. The required gallantry for decoration, while of lesser degree than that required for decoration of the Texas Medal of Honor, must nevertheless be performed with marked distinction.

Authority
The Lone Star Medal of Valor was authorized by the Fifty-eighth Texas Legislature in Senate Bill Number 279 and approved by Governor John Connally on 3 May 1963, effective 23 August 1963.

Description

Medal 
The medal pendant is a silver five-pointed star, point up, 1-1/2 of an inch in circumscribing diameter. In the raised center of the star is a live oak branch with acorns on the wearer's right and an olive branch with olives on the wearer's left encircle the inscription, "VALOR". The star is suspended by one link from a silver bar, 1-3/8 of an inch long and 9/32 of an inch high, bearing the inscription "TEXAS" in raised letters. The reverse of the pendant and bar is blank. The pendant is suspended by a metal loop attached to a dark blue moiré silk neckband 1-3/8 of an inch wide and 24 inches long behind a hexagonal pad in the center, made of the same ribbon as the neckband. The color of the ribbon is the blue used in the ribbon of the United States Army's Distinguished Service Cross. A white enameled five-pointed star, 3/8 of an inch in circumscribing diameter, is centered on the hexagonal pad, point up.

Device 
A silver twig of four oak leaves with three acorns on the stem is conferred for second and succeeding decorations. Oak leaf clusters will be worn centered progressively to the wearer's right and left of the white enameled star on the neck band pad and the service ribbon. A maximum of four clusters will be worn.

Lapel button 
A lapel button, in the form of an enameled replica of the service ribbon, 1/8 of an inch in height and 21/32 of an inch in width is conferred with this decoration. The Texas Medal of Honor and Texas Medal of Valor are the only decorations with lapel buttons.

Recipients

See also 

 Awards and decorations of the Texas Military
 Awards and decorations of the Texas government

 Texas Military Forces
 Texas Military Department
 List of conflicts involving the Texas Military

External links
Texas Medal of Valor

References 

Texas
Texas Military Department
Texas Military Forces